Oxybasis rubra (syn. Chenopodium rubrum), common names red goosefoot or coastblite goosefoot, is a member of the genus Oxybasis, a segregate of Chenopodium (the goosefoots). It is native to North America and Eurasia. It is an annual plant.

Conservation status in the United States
It is listed a special concern and believed extirpated in Connecticut. It is listed as endangered in New Jersey, and as threatened in Maine, New Hampshire, and in New York.

Native American ethnobotany
The Goshute Shosone of Utah use the seeds for food. The name of the plant in the Goshute Shoshone language is on’-tǐm-pi-wa-tsǐp, on’-tǐm-pi-wa, on’-tǐm-pi-a-wa or on’-tǐm-pai-wa.

References

External links
Jepson Manual Treatment - Chenopodium rubrum
USDA Plants Profile: Chenopodium rubrum
Flora of North America
Chenopodium rubrum Flowers in Israel

Chenopodioideae
Flora of the Canadian Prairies
Flora of California
Flora of the Great Basin
Flora of the California desert regions
Medicinal plants of Asia
Medicinal plants of Europe
Medicinal plants of North America
Flora of Lebanon
Flora of New Jersey
Flora of North America
Plants described in 1753
Taxa named by Carl Linnaeus
Plants used in Native American cuisine